William Whitlock may refer to:

Ordered chronologically
 William Whitelock (1636–1717), also spelt Whitlock, English gentleman and member of parliament for the University of Oxford
 William Whitlock Jr. (1791–1875), American businessman
 Billy Whitlock (1813–1878), American blackface performer
 William Whitlock (journalist) (1891–1977), New Zealand journalist, newspaper editor and proprietor
 William Whitlock (politician) (1918–2001), British Labour Party MP for Nottingham North